SONU GOYAT SON OF BARU RAM SUNDER SINGH (GOYAT DIGITAL STUDIO KUNGAR) & FISHING POND

Kungar is a village in the Bhiwani district of the Indian state of Haryana. , the village had 1,902 households with a population of 9,846 of which 5,292 were male and 4,554 females. Kungar is in two divisions: Chota Pana and Bada Pana.

The languages used by villagers are Haryanvi, Hindi and English. There is a branch of the State Bank of India in Kungar.

There are seven schools:
Hindu Middle School
Govt.Primary School
Bachpan Kid school
Bhaght Senior Secondary School
Govt. High School (for Boys )
Govt. High School (For Girls)
Majir Nafe Singh Kungeriya Vidya Vihar School and College 
Famous Personalities -
Thekedar Rajesh Goyat  ( Wine and Liquor Contractor)
Jaswant Goyat (Indian Army Kargil War)
Subhash Goyat (Farmer ) Son Of Bharat Singh Goyat 
Ashish Goyat ( Fighter Pilot Indian Airforce)
Vivek Goyat ( Airman Indian Airforce) Son of Jaswant Goyat
Amit Goyat (Thekedar kungar) Son of Thekedar Rajesh Goyat
Balvinder Goyat( Haryana Roadways Conductor

Agriculture -
Crop -
 Rice ,Wheat, Sugarcane, Cotton 
Fruit -
In Past time Kungar famous for  Grapes cultivation  But after the Flood of 1995 Grapes Farm is destroy by Increasing level of the ground Water
Current Time  Guava cultivation is on Peak.

Animal Husbandry -
In Haryana Kungar Village is famous for Murra Buffalo breed .

 In Bawani Khera tahsil Kungar Village is Top In 
 Number of tractors, Rice Harvester Machine ,Wheat Harvester Machine and Other Agriculture Equipments uses.

References

Villages in Bhiwani district